Greatest Hits is a compilation album by Welsh singer Bonnie Tyler. It was released on 14 September 2001 by Sanctuary Records. The album features Tyler's major career hits and one of her latest recordings from the time, "Tyre Tracks and Broken Hearts".

Greatest Hits became a substantial hit in several European countries, and was certified Platinum by the IFPI Norway. It received a positive review from AllMusic and is among Tyler's best-selling compilation albums.

Background
Tyler had a photoshoot directed by Paul Cox, who was photographer for her 1995 album Free Spirit.

The album includes one of Tyler's latest recordings from the time of release, "Tyre Tracks and Broken Hearts". The song was written by Jim Steinman and Andrew Lloyd Webber and originally recorded for the concept album for the 1996 musical Whistle Down the Wind. Tyler performed the song live at Webber's 50th birthday celebration at the Royal Albert Hall in London, 1998.

Critical reception
Greatest Hits was given three and a half stars out of five from AllMusic. They stated that, "As long as it has "Total Eclipse of the Heart", "It's a Heartache", "Faster Than the Speed of Night" and "Holding Out for a Hero" on it, any Bonnie Tyler compilation is going to earn a few stars, and this collection from Sanctuary is no exception."

Track listings

Charts

Weekly charts

Year-end charts

Certifications

Personnel
 Management – David Aspden
 Mastering – Andy Pearce

References

2001 greatest hits albums
Bonnie Tyler compilation albums
Sony Music compilation albums
Sanctuary Records compilation albums